Emma McMaster (born 9 March 1999) is a Northern Irish association footballer who plays as a midfielder for Women's Premiership club Glentoran and the Northern Ireland women's national team.

References

1999 births
Living people
Women's association football midfielders
Women's association footballers from Northern Ireland
Northern Ireland women's international footballers
Cliftonville F.C. players
Glentoran F.C. players
Women's futsal players
Newry City Ladies F.C. players